The Changan UNI-T is a compact crossover SUV produced by Changan Automobile.

Overview

Changan showed a first glimpse of the UNI-T at the Shanghai Auto Show in April 2017 with the concept vehicle Yuyue Concept. 

The production model was intended to be presented at the Geneva Motor Show in March 2020. However, the show was canceled on 28 February 2020 due to the ongoing COVID-19 pandemic, leading to Changan presenting the UNI-T in China at the end of March 2020. The model came on the Chinese market in June 2020.

The Changan UNI-T received a five star safety certification in the safety crash test result of the domestic C-NCAP published by CATARC (China Automotive Technology and Research Center) on 15 September 2021.

Powertrain
The UNI-T is powered by a turbocharged 1.5-litre petrol engine with  mated with an automatic 7-speed dual clutch transmission.

References

External links

UNI-T
Compact sport utility vehicles
Crossover sport utility vehicles
Cars introduced in 2020